Mineh (also Romanized as Mīneh; also known as Mīnā and Mīneh-ye Soflá) is a village in Shurab Rural District, Veysian District, Dowreh County, Lorestan Province, Iran. At the 2006 census, its population was 429, in 81 families.

References 

Towns and villages in Dowreh County